Sinix may refer to:
 SINIX, computer operating system
 Şınıx, Azerbaijan